Manyu is a division of the Southwest Region in Cameroon. The division covers an area of 9,565 km and as of 2005 had a total population of 181,039. The capital of the division is Mamfe.

Sub-divisions

The division is divided administratively into 4 sub-divisions and in every sud-division there are villages or wards.
 Akwaya:
 Kesham
 Kajifu
 Bache
 Obonyi
 Ngale-Akwaya
 Ossatu 
 Takamanda
 Eyumojock
 Upper Bayang
  Mamfe Central

References

Southwest Region (Cameroon)
Departments of Cameroon